Malmsbury railway station is located on the Deniliquin line in Victoria, Australia. It serves the town of Malmsbury, and it opened on 21 October 1862.

In 1968, a carriage dock and a number of sidings were removed. Further sidings were removed in 1978.

A large bluestone station building remains on the former northern platform, and a collection of shelter sheds on the southern platform. As part of the Regional Fast Rail project in 2006, the double-track line from Kyneton to Bendigo was converted to single-track, with the track on the Melbourne bound platform removed.

Disused stations Taradale and Elphinstone are located between Malmsbury and Castlemaine. Demolished station Chewton was also located between Malmsbury and Castlemaine, while Redesdale Junction was located between Malmsbury and Kyneton.

Platforms and services

Malmsbury has one platform. It is serviced by V/Line Bendigo line and weekend Echuca line services in both directions, and one weekday and one weekend Swan Hill line service.

Platform 1:
 services to Bendigo, Epsom, Eaglehawk and Southern Cross
 weekend services to Echuca and Southern Cross
 one weekday and one weekend service to Swan Hill

References

External links

Victorian Railway Stations gallery
Melway map at street-directory.com.au

Railway stations in Australia opened in 1862
Regional railway stations in Victoria (Australia)